Lourdes-de-Joliette Airport  is a registered aerodrome located  north of Lourdes-de-Joliette, Quebec, Canada.

References

Registered aerodromes in Lanaudière